1975–76 was the 29th season of the Western International Hockey League.

Standings

 Cranbrook Royals				48		29	19	 0				227	185		 58
 Trail Smoke Eaters				48		29	19	 0				200	193		 58
 Spokane Flyers					48		26	22	 0				212	185		 52	
 Kimberley Dynamiters				48		18	29	 1				202	227		 37
 Nelson Maple Leafs 				48		17	30	 1				177	228		 35

Playoffs

Semi finals

Best of 7

 Cranbrook Royals defeated Kimberley Dynamiters 4 games to 1 (6-4, 3-4, 4-1, 7-3, 4-1)
 Spokane Flyers defeated Trail Smoke Eaters 4 games to 1 (6-2, 5-4, 0-0, 4-6, 7-4)

The third game of the series between Spokane and Trail was called off due to a brawl.

Final
In the "Best of 7" final, the Spokane Flyers defeated Cranbrook Royals 4 games to 3 (1-3, 5-4, 7-6, 3-4 OT, 0-4, 8-4, 6-5). The Spokane Flyers advanced to the 1976 Western Canada Allan Cup Playoffs.

References 

Western International Hockey League seasons
WIHL
WIHL